María Carmina Muñiz Villarroel-Legaspi (born August 17, 1975) is a Filipino actress, television presenter, and product endorser.

Personal life
Villarroel was previously married to Rustom Padilla in 1994; the two had no children, and Villarroel filed for annulment several years after, which was granted in 2002.

Villarroel married her partner Zoren Legaspi on November 15, 2012; the couple had twins on January 6, 2001, in the United States. Legaspi planned a surprise proposal and civil wedding with the help of their families and the network. The ceremony was later air the following Saturday as the television special Zoren-Carmina: Always Forever, A Wedding Like No Other. The idea of a surprise proposal followed by a flashmob-style instant wedding was inspired by a remarkably similar episode of the U.S. television programme Mobbed, hosted by Howie Mandel.

Filmography

Films

Television

Awards and nominations

References

External links

1975 births
Living people
ABS-CBN personalities
Actresses from Laguna (province)
Filipino child actresses
Filipino film actresses
Filipino people of Spanish descent
Filipino television actresses
GMA Network personalities
That's Entertainment (Philippine TV series)
That's Entertainment Monday Group Members